A centrepiece (or centerpiece) is a decorative object on a table.

Centrepiece or Centerpiece may also refer to:
 Centrepiece, a TV series about centrepieces — see List of Quibi original programming
 "Centerpiece" (song), a 1958 jazz standard